A mock execution is a stratagem in which a victim is deliberately but falsely made to feel that their execution or that of another person is imminent or is taking place. The subject is made to believe that they are being led to their own execution. This might involve blindfolding the subjects, making them recount last wishes, making them dig their own grave, holding an unloaded gun to their head and pulling the trigger, shooting near (but not at) the victim, or firing blanks. Mock execution is categorized as psychological torture. There is a sense of fear induced when a person is made to feel that they are about to be executed or witness someone being executed. Mock execution is considered psychological torture due to the mental harm it causes. The psychological trauma can lead to depression, anxiety disorders, post-traumatic stress disorder, and other mental disorders.

Historical instances 
 
 In 1849, members of Russian political discussion group the Petrashevsky Circle, including writer Fyodor Dostoevsky, were convicted for high treason and sentenced to execution by firing squad. The sentences were commuted to hard labour secretly and the prisoners were told only after all the preparations for execution had been carried out. Dostoevsky described the experience in his novel The Idiot.    
 In 1968, Commander Lloyd M. Bucher, Commander of the USS Pueblo, was tortured and put through a mock firing squad by North Korean interrogators in an effort to make him confess.
 The American hostages held by Iran in 1979 were subjected to a mock execution by their detainers.
 Reports of mock executions carried out by the US Marines on detainees in Iraq surfaced in December 2004, as the American Civil Liberties Union published internal documents of the Naval Criminal Investigative Service (NCIS) obtained through the Freedom of Information Act. The documents were written seven weeks after the publication of the photographs which triggered the Abu Ghraib prisoner abuse scandal.
In 2000, British military hostages in Sierra Leone were subject to mock executions by the West Side Boys to get information from them.
 In April 2003, U.S. Army Lieutenant Colonel Allen West had an Iraqi police officer Hamoodi seized and brought in for questioning based on allegations he was planning an imminent attack on West's unit. After Hamoodi was allegedly beaten by an interpreter and several U.S. troops, West took Hamoodi out of the interrogation room and showed him six U.S. troops with weapons in hand. West told Hamoodi, "If you don't talk, they will kill you."  West then placed Hamoodi's head in a sand-filled barrel used for clearing weapons, placed his gun into the barrel and discharged the weapon near Hamoodi's head. Hamoodi then provided West with names, location and methods of the alleged ambush, which never happened, and no evidence of any plans of attack was found. Hamoodi was released without charges; West was charged with violations of two statutes of the Uniform Code of Military Justice, but charges were dropped after West was fined $5,000 for the incident and allowed to resign his position with the U.S. Army without court martial.
 In 2014 journalist James Foley was subjected to mock executions by ISIL militants before he was beheaded. Mock executions are reported to be a common torture tactic used by ISIL.

See also 
 Death row phenomenon: the psychological trauma that is experienced by death row inmates

References

External links 
 Newsweek: Inspector General Report Reveals CIA Conducted Mock Executions.  Interview with  Michael Isikoff, investigative correspondent for Newsweek by Amy Goodwin, Democracy Now!
   Hárdi, L., Király, G., Kovács, E., & Heffernan, K., "Torture and survivors, Manual for experts in refugee care", Cordelia Foundation for the Rehabilitation of Torture Victims.  Budapest, Hungary.  United Nations, Office of the High Commissioner for Human Rights. Revised edition (2010).

Capital punishment
Psychological torture techniques